HMS E23 was an E-class submarine built by Vickers, Barrow-in-Furness. She was laid down on 28 September 1914 and was commissioned on 6 December 1915. E23 torpedoed the German dreadnought  (18,900 tons), holing her off Terschelling on 19 August 1916. E23 was sold on 6 September 1922 in Sunderland.

Design
She was powered by two  Vickers eight-cylinder two-stroke diesel engines and two  electric motors.

E23 was armed with a 12-pounder  QF gun, mounted forward of the conning tower. She had five 18-inch (450 mm) torpedo tubes, two in the bow, one either side amidships and one in the stern with ten torpedoes on board.

E-class submarines had wireless systems with  power ratings; in some submarines, these were later upgraded to  systems by removing a midship torpedo tube. Their maximum design depth was  although in service some reached depths of below . Some submarines contained Fessenden oscillator systems.

Crew
Her complement was three officers and 28 men.

References

 

British E-class submarines of the Royal Navy
Ships built in Barrow-in-Furness
1915 ships
World War I submarines of the United Kingdom
Royal Navy ship names